San Godenzo is a comune (municipality) in the Metropolitan City of Florence in the Italian region Tuscany, located about  northeast of Florence, in the Tuscan-Emilian Apennines.

San Godenzo borders the following municipalities: Dicomano, Londa, Marradi, Portico e San Benedetto, Premilcuore, Santa Sofia, Stia.

Located at the foot of the Monte Falterona, it is one of the accesses to the Foreste Casentinesi, Monte Falterona e Campigna National Park. The frazione of Castagno d'Andrea was the birthplace of the Renaissance painter Andrea del Castagno.

Demographic evolution

References

Cities and towns in Tuscany